Senator Rios may refer to:

Pete Rios (1980s–2000s), Arizona State Senate
Rebecca Rios (born 1967), Arizona State Senate
Juan Cancel Ríos (1925–1992), Senate of Puerto Rico